Molly Seidel (born July 12, 1994) is an American long distance runner. Seidel represented the United States at the Great Edinburgh Cross Country in 2012, 2013, and 2018. In her first-ever marathon, Seidel placed second at the 2020 U.S. Marathon Olympic Trials. Later, she went on to win the bronze medal in her third career marathon at the 2020 Summer Olympics in Tokyo. At the University of Notre Dame, Seidel was a 4-time NCAA champion, 6-time NCAA All-American, 6-time Atlantic Coast Conference champion and 2016 female ACC Athlete of the Year.

Early life and education
Seidel grew up in Hartland, Wisconsin, and attended University Lake School. Molly won Gatorade National Female Cross Country Runner of the Year. She also was named Gatorade Wisconsin Female Cross Country Runner of the Year in 2011. Seidel won the 2011 national Foot Locker Cross Country Championships, breaking the tape in 17:22. Seidel won Wisconsin Interscholastic Athletic Association cross country, 1600m, and 3200m titles at the state meet all four years totaling 12 titles. Seidel earned New Balance Indoor Nationals mile and two-mile All-American honors in 2011. Seidel was invited to the Bupa Great Edinburgh International Challenge in Scotland where she placed third (15:16) in the 4K and was the first USA high school finisher.

NCAA
Seidel attended the University of Notre Dame, and was the 2015 NCAA Division 1 national cross country champion and the 2016 NCAA Division I national indoor track and field 3000 meters and 5000 meters champion. Seidel won 10,000 meters title at 2015 NCAA Division I Outdoor Track and Field Championships. Seidel was a six time Atlantic Coast Conference champion. She won the Honda Sports Award as the nation's top female cross country runner in 2016.

NOTE:  Notre Dame was in the Big East in 2012–13, but moved to the Atlantic Coast Conference starting in 2013–14.

Professional
Seidel was invited to the 2012 Bupa Great Edinburgh International Cross Country in Scotland where she placed third (15:16) in the 4 km and was the first USA high school finisher.

Seidel placed fourteenth in 20:13 in 2016 USATF National Club Cross Country Championships. She ran the 2017 USATF Road 5k Championships Abbott Dash to the Finishline 5k in 15:35, her professional debut road race representing Saucony.

Seidel qualified to represent Team USA at the 2018 Great Edinburgh International Cross Country in Scotland. Seidel finished third in the 6 km event in a time of 21:04, helping Team USA to an overall bronze.

Seidel continued 2018 season with a 2nd place at the 2018 USA Cross Country Championships. She qualified for Team USA at 2018 NACAC Cross Country Championships in La Libertad, El Salvador on February 17, 2018.

In Atlanta, Georgia, at the U.S. Woman's Olympic Trials Marathon on February 29, 2020, Seidel broke from the pack along with Aliphine Tuliamuk. Over the rolling hills of the course, the two pushed each other and took a large lead over third place Sally Kipyego. Seidel finished eight seconds behind Tuliamuk for a second place in 2:27:31. She earned a spot on the US Olympic Team and won $65,000.

On October 4, 2020, Seidel ran the London Marathon and finished 6th overall. She was the second American woman, finishing with a personal best time of 2:25:13.

With the Olympic postponement, Seidel broke her personal mark in the half marathon at Hampton, Georgia, running a 1:08:28 on February 28, 2021 in the Publix Atlanta Half Marathon held on the premises of the Atlanta Motor Speedway.

On August 6, 2021, Seidel won the bronze medal in the Tokyo 2020 marathon and was the first woman from the United States to win an Olympic marathon medal since Deena Kastor's bronze in 2004.

Seidel finished fourth at the 2021 New York City Marathon with a time of 2:24:42, which was the fastest ever by an American woman. She won $50,000 in prize money--$25,000 for her fourth-place finish and $25,000 for finishing as the top American.

On April 18, 2022, Seidel competed in the 2022 Boston Marathon. She was in the lead pack for the first half of the race, but ended up withdrawing after 16 miles due to a hip impingement.

Competition record

Marathons

International results

References

External links

Molly Seidel all-athletic profile

Molly Seidel – University of Notre Dame cross country profile
Molly Seidel – University of Notre Dame track profile

1994 births
Living people
American female middle-distance runners
Notre Dame Fighting Irish women's track and field athletes
People from Brookfield, Wisconsin
Track and field athletes from Wisconsin
Track and field athletes from Boston
American female long-distance runners
Notre Dame Fighting Irish women's cross country runners
People from Hartland, Wisconsin
Athletes (track and field) at the 2020 Summer Olympics
Medalists at the 2020 Summer Olympics
Olympic bronze medalists for the United States in track and field